Theresa Lippincott Anulewicz (born August 18, 1976) is an American politician. Anulewicz is the Georgia State Representative from District 42.

References

External links 
 Official website
 State House
 Facebook
 Twitter

Living people
Women state legislators in Georgia (U.S. state)
Democratic Party members of the Georgia House of Representatives
Agnes Scott College alumni
21st-century American women politicians
21st-century American politicians
Politicians from New Orleans
1976 births